Raimondo Manzini may refer to:

 Raimondo Manzini (1668–1744)
 Raimondo Manzini (1901–1988)

See also

 Manzini (disambiguation)